Loikaw District is a district of the Kayah State in eastern part of Myanmar.

Townships

The district contains the following townships, cities and towns:

Loikaw Township 
Loikaw
Loilinlay
Lawpita
Shadaw Township
Shadaw
In April 2022, Demoso Township and Hpruso Township were formed as Demoso District.

References

Districts of Myanmar
Kayah State